The 1930 Syracuse Orangemen football team represented Syracuse University in the 1930 college football season. The Orangemen were led by first-year head coach Vic Hanson and played their home games at Archbold Stadium in Syracuse, New York. Hanson was previously an All-American football and basketball player for the Orangemen in the 1920s, and was hired as coach after serving as an assistant in 1928 and 1929.

Schedule

References

Syracuse
Syracuse Orange football seasons
Syracuse Orangemen football